Phytoecia suvorowi is a species of beetle in the family Cerambycidae. It was described by Maurice Pic in 1905. It is known from Azerbaijan, Armenia, and Turkey.

References

Phytoecia
Beetles described in 1905